The Yan'an Forum on Literature and Art was a May 1942 forum held at the city of Yan'an in Communist-controlled China and significant event in the Yan'an Rectification Movement. It is most notable for the speeches given by Mao Zedong, later edited and published as Talks at the Yan'an Forum on Literature and Art which dealt with the role of literature and art in the country. The two main points were that (1) all art should reflect the life of the working class and consider them as an audience, and (2) that art should serve politics, and specifically the advancement of socialism. The excesses of the latter point during the Cultural Revolution led to current Party policy rejecting that point, but retaining Mao's encouragement of peasant-focused art and literature.

Background
During the Long March (1934-1935), the Communist Party and People's Liberation Army used song, drama, and dance to appeal to the civilian population, but did not have a unified cultural policy. For three years after the outbreak of the Second Sino-Japanese War in 1937, the main message of the Communist art organizations, such as the Chinese People's Anti-Japanese Drama Society, was to "oppose Japan" (fǎnrì) or "resist Japan" (kàngrì). In 1938, the Party established the Lu Xun Academy of Fine Arts in Yan'an (Yenan), which was to train people in literature, music, fine arts, and drama.

In 1940, Mao issued a policy statement in his tract, "On New Democracy": "The content of China's new culture at the present stage is... the anti-imperialist anti-feudal new democracy of the popular masses led by the culture and thought of the proletariat". During the Yan'an Rectification Movement (1942-1944), the Party used various methods to consolidate ideological unity among cadres around Maoism (as opposed to Soviet-style Marxism–Leninism). The immediate spur to the Yan'an talks was a request by a concerned writer for Mao Zedong to clarify the ambiguous role of intellectuals in the Communist movement. Thus began a three-week conference at the Lu Xun Academy about the objectives of and methods of creating Communist art.

Content
The "Yan'an Talks" outlined the party's policy on "mass culture" in China, which was to be "revolutionary culture". This revolutionary style of art would portray the lives of peasants and be directed towards them as an audience. Mao scolded artists for neglecting "The cadres, party workers of all types, fighters in the army, workers in the factories and peasants in the villages" as audiences, just because they were illiterate. He was particularly critical of Chinese opera as a courtly art form, rather than one directed towards the masses. However, he encouraged artists to draw from China's artistic legacy as well as international art forms in order to further socialism. Mao also encouraged literary people to transform themselves by living in the countryside, and to study the popular music and folk culture of the areas, incorporating both into their works. Mao stated that transformations in the social relations of production required development of a new societal consciousness. In this view, socialist literature should not merely reflect existing culture, but should help culturally produce the consciousness of a new society. Mao articulated five independent although related categories of creative consideration for cultural production: (1) class stand, (2) attitude, (3) audience, (4) work style, and (5) popularization/massification.. 

The endeavor of implementing the Yan'an Talks involved the creation of new literary forms and content tailored to the socialist transformation of China and its culture, an endeavor that was much more complex than applying ideological standards to measure existing artistic forms. As summarized by academic Cai Xiang, the great writers of the period embraced this endeavor, while the practice was essentially inaccessible to hacks.

Legacy
An immediate change in Chinese music that resulted from the Yan'an Talks was the growth in respectability of folk styles. The Talks also provided political legitimacy to traditional Chinese novel forms such as episodic chapters.

Key quotations from Yan'an Talks form the basis of the section on "Culture and Art" in the Maoist text Quotations from Chairman Mao Zedong. The Gang of Four's dramatic interpretation of the Yan'an Talks during the Cultural Revolution led to a new Party-sanctioned form of political art, revolutionary opera. Conversely, certain forms of art, such as the works of Beethoven, Respighi, Dvorak, and Chopin, were condemned in Party papers as "bourgeois decadence". 

Cai writes that over time, the important principles of the Yan'an Talks became increasingly simplified, ultimately resulting in the dogmatizing of the requirements for literature during the Cultural Revolution, which undermined the radicalism of China's socialist literature. After the death of Mao and the rise of reformist leaders like Deng Xiaoping, who condemned the Cultural Revolution, the Yan'an talks were officially reevaluated. In 1982, the Party declared that Mao's doctrine that "literature and art are subordinate to politics" was an "incorrect formulation", but it reaffirmed his main points about art needing to reflect the reality of the workers and peasantry.

See also

 Socialist realism
 Red Detachment of Women

Notes

Further reading 

 McDougall, Bonnie. (1980). Mao Zedong's "Talks at the Yan'an Conference on Literature and Art": A Translation of the 1943 Text with Commentary. University of Michigan Press. 

Works by Mao Zedong
1942 essays